The Military Police Corps (MP) (PA) is the corps of the Irish Defence Forces responsible for the provision of policing service personnel and providing a military police presence to forces while on exercise and deployment. Its tasks increase during wartime to include traffic control organisation and POW and refugee control. The Military Police are distinguished from other units by their wearing of a red beret.

The Military Police enjoy a close working relationship with the Garda Síochána at both national and local levels, with the Gardaí providing training in criminal investigation to the corps.

History
The MPC was first established in 1922 during the Irish Civil War when they took over military police duties from British troops before the corps was fully established in 1923.

Incidents
In 2011, the MPC reported that a Corporal on guard duty in Dublin in the Government Buildings committed suicide on 27 December 2010.

Organisation
The Corps has three regular army companies and one special-purpose company:

1st Brigade Military Police Company
2nd Brigade Military Police Company
Defence Forces Training Centre (DFTC) Military Police Company
Military Police Government Buildings Company

The two brigade companies provide general policing support to each of the army's territorial brigades. The DFTC company provides similar support to the Defence Forces Training Centre.

The Air Corps and Naval Service now have Military Police Sections dressed in their own distinctive uniforms.

Military Police are armed with the Heckler & Koch USP service pistol and Steyr AUG assault rifle.

Restructuring
The Irish Army reduced to a two brigade structure in 2012, and the Military Police have also been reduced, based in the 1st Southern and 2nd Northern Brigades.

Units disbanded in the Defense Forces Re-organisation of 2012:
4th Brigade Military Police Company (2012)
Military Police Section, Air Corps. Attached to the Irish Air Corps (2012)
Military Police Section, Naval Service. Attached to the Irish Naval Service (2012)
31st Reserve Military Police Company (2012)
54th Reserve Military Police Company (2012)
62nd Reserve Military Police Company (2012)

Equipment

Weapons

Uniform
MPC soldiers wear the red beret as standard, both regular and reserve.

See also
 Military police#Ireland

References

External links
 The Military Police Corps

Law enforcement agencies of the Republic of Ireland
Ireland
Military Police Corps
Military of the Republic of Ireland
Military units and formations established in 1924